Sant'Andrea is the Italian name for St. Andrew, most commonly Andrew the Apostle. It  may refer to:

Communes in Italy 
Castronuovo di Sant'Andrea, Basilicata
Cazzano Sant'Andrea, Lombardy
Mazzarrà Sant'Andrea, Sicily
Penna Sant'Andrea, Abruzzo 
Sant'Andrea di Conza, Campania
Sant'Andrea Frius, South Sardinia 
Sant'Andrea del Garigliano, Frosinone
Sant'Andrea Apostolo dello Ionio, Calabria 
Sant'Andrea di Suasa, Pesaro-Urbino

Other Italian localities
Sant'Andrea, frazione  of Colle di Val d'Elsa
Sant'Andrea dei Lagni, frazione di Santa Maria Capua Vetere
Torre Sant'Andrea, part of the communal territory of Melendugno (province of Lecce)
Sant'Andrea in Percussina, frazione of San Casciano Val di Pesa (province of Florence)

Communes in France
Sant'Andréa-d'Orcino
Sant'Andrea-di Bozio
Sant'Andrea-di-Cotone

Islands
Isola di Sant'Andrea
Sant'Andrea (Venetian Lagoon)

Churches
Basilica di Sant'Andrea di Mantova, Mantua
Basilica di Sant'Andrea (Vercelli)
Carrara Cathedral (dedicated to St. Andrew)
Chiesa di Sant'Andrea (Acquaviva), San Marino
Chiesa di Sant'Andrea (Serravalle), San Marino
Sant'Andrea della Valle, Rome
Sant'Andrea in Via Flaminia, Rome
Sant'Andrea della Zirada, Venice
Pieve di Sant'Andrea (Cercina)
Pieve di Sant'Andrea (Pistoia)

See also
St Andrew